Ivo Maria Robert Belet (born on 7 June 1959 in Sint-Truiden), is a Belgian politician who served as Member of the European Parliament for Flanders with the CD&V, part of the European People's Party. He is a former news anchor of VRT, the Flemish public broadcaster.

Education and early career
 1981: Degree in Germanic philology
 1983: Trainee at the European Parliament and the European Commission
 1984: Assistant to an MEP
 1985: Editor at Concentra NV
 1988: Degree in economics
 1989: Journalist with VRT-TV (Flemish Radio and Television Company)
 1996: MBA

Member of the European Parliament, 2004–2019
During his time as Member of the European Parliament from 2004 until 2019, Belet served on the Committee on Industry, Research and Energy (2004-2006, 2009-2014), the Committee on Culture and Education (2006–2009) and the Committee on the Environment, Public Health and Food Safety (since 2014). From 2008 until 2009, he was a member of the Temporary Committee on Climate Change. From 2017 until 2019, he also served on the Special Committee on Terrorism, a temporary body to address the practical and legislative deficiencies in the fight against terrorism across the EU.

Belet was a substitute for the Committee on Transport and Tourism. He was also a member of the delegation for relations with India. In addition to his committee assignments, he served as a member of the European Parliament Intergroup on Children's Rights.

Political positions
In May 2011, as rapporteur on the future of professional football, with Syed Kamall, Chairman of the Parliamentary Sports Intergroup, he called for a reform of the Fédération Internationale de Football Association: "FIFA is facing a series of corruption scandals, dragging professional football through the mud. It is time for a big clean-up. We, in the European Parliament, therefore support a thorough reform of FIFA. A transparent and independent committee needs to lead an enquiry into the malpractices".

See also
2004 European Parliament election in Belgium

References

External links
 Website of Ivo Belet
 
 

1959 births
Living people
Christian Democratic and Flemish MEPs
MEPs for Belgium 2004–2009
MEPs for Belgium 2009–2014
MEPs for Belgium 2014–2019